is a Japanese field hockey player who plays as a defender for the Japanese national team.

Career

Club level
In 2019, Zendana was signed to play for the Adelaide Fire men's team in Hockey Australia's new national league, the Sultana Bran Hockey One.

Senior national team
Zendana made his debut for the Japanese national team in 2014, during a test series against New Zealand in Wellington.

In 2018, Zendana won his first medal with the national team at the 2018 Asian Games in Jakarta. The team won gold after defeating Malaysia 3–1 in a shoot-out, to qualify for the 2020 Summer Olympics in Tokyo.

References

External links

1993 births
Japanese male field hockey players
Living people
Male field hockey defenders
Field hockey players at the 2020 Summer Olympics
Olympic field hockey players of Japan
Field hockey players at the 2018 Asian Games
Asian Games medalists in field hockey
Medalists at the 2018 Asian Games
Asian Games gold medalists for Japan
Expatriate field hockey players
Japanese expatriate sportspeople in Australia
Sportspeople from Shimane Prefecture
21st-century Japanese people